Abralia dubia is a species of enoploteuthid cephalopod known from the Red Sea.

References

Abralia
Molluscs described in 1960